Mutants is a 2008 horror film starring Michael Ironside.

Plot 
The story of Mutants is told in a non-linear fashion. Flashbacks telling the main story are framed by pieces of a conversation between government agent Marcus Santiago (Steven Bauer) and Colonel Gauge (Michael Ironside), the leader of Shadow Rock Securities International.

At the beginning of the film, Santiago is seen briefing Gauge on his mission, which involved spying on the Just Rite Sugar Company, who are allegedly involved in some kind of plot involving an unethical Russian scientist as well as Shadow Rock Securities itself. A visibly shaken Santiago warns Gauge that Shadow Rock's leader, Colonel Briggs, is involved in the plot; however, once assured that Briggs has been detained and Gauge is now Shadow Rock's commander, he details his activities, which included planting wire taps and spying on the operations of Just Rite. Santiago berates himself for following his orders – to spy but not get involved – too closely, as he could have stopped the plan before it progressed to its current stage, which he claims could be the extinction of humanity.

Prior to this, Just Rite security officials pursue an escaped girl, Hannah (Jessica Heap) through a seemingly abandoned mill, capturing and killing her before disposing of her body in a boiler.

Just Rite CEO Braylon (Richard Zeringue) meets with his security commander, Sykes (Tony Senzamici) who informs him of the events at the mill. Braylon entrusts Sykes with cleaning up the situation, as some potential investors in his new sugar formula will be visiting the mill soon. It is revealed that Braylon intends to create a new type of sugar with an additive more addictive than crack cocaine and heroin combined, and to that end, he has hired Sergei (Armando Leduc) to conduct experiments in the mill. The men under Sykes's command were directed to abduct addicts and homeless people for Sergei's experiments, reasoning that nobody would be looking for such people if they disappeared. He is more enraged by Sykes's men accidentally abducting Ryan (Derrick Denicola), the brother of Braylon's secretary Erin (Sharon Landry), in the course of abducting Hannah, than he is by Hannah's escape and death. It is revealed that previous batches of sugar devised by Sergei caused infections in their test subjects, and even though Hannah was previously designated "status clear," Braylon and Sergei are confident she was an anomaly, as no other subjects from the most recent batch became infected.

Ryan and Erin's father Griff (Louis Herthum), a Just Rite security guard dealing with alcoholism following his wife's death, discovers strange shipments being made to a supposedly abandoned sugar mill – which is also being observed by Santiago – and learns that Braylon has hired Shadow Rock to guard it independently of his usual security team. Meanwhile, Erin begins receiving strange e-mails at her desk from a mysterious figure calling themselves "Cinderella." Apparently a mole within Just Rite, Cinderella first sends Erin financial documents showing money being spent on the abandoned mill, then a photograph of Ryan in his holding cell. Together, Griff and Erin realize that Ryan must be at the mill, and resolve to rescue him.

Sergei makes an ominous discovery – the latest batch of sugar, which was shipped out when it was verified clear, actually is infected as well, with the infection manifesting three months after ingestion. Upon receiving this news, Sykes gives up on the plan and decides to call in Shadow Rock's extermination team. Sergei pulls a gun, but Sykes kills him.

Erin and Griff infiltrate the mill by hiding inside a truck. While roaming around searching for Ryan, they encounter Sykes and prepare for a confrontation. However, Sykes reveals that he is Cinderella and joins them, escorting them to Ryan's cell. While they are reunited, Braylon escorts his potential investors around the mill, proudly showing them some of the test subjects. He explains while showing them one failed subject that the infection in the previous sugar batches attacks the victim's brain and breaks down their body, a point made clear when he shows them the longest-surviving subject, whose body has melted in many places. However, when Braylon opens the door of a subject he believes is "status clear," the subject is actually infected and attacks them. While one of Braylon's guards kills the infected subject, it is not before a security alarm is tripped that puts the entire mill on lockdown. This leaves Erin, Ryan, Griff and Sykes to escape through the ward where the most dangerous subjects are kept; meanwhile, Braylon and his investors escape and when the investors refuse to play any role in Braylon's plan, Braylon kills them both.

The Shadow Rock forces led by Gauge arrive at the mill and begin exterminating the infected. Erin, Ryan, Griff and Sykes manage to escape, but Sykes is shot and gets separated from the group in the confusion, and Ryan discovers that despite being "status clear" earlier, the boils characteristic of an infection have developed on his arm. Colonel Briggs (Marc Gill) suddenly appears and begins killing Gauge's men after freeing the trapped Braylon. He ambushes Gauge and shoots him in the shoulder, and the two briefly exchange gunfire while discussing the internal coup Gauge staged against Briggs. Gauge gives up when his gun runs out of bullets and steps out, inviting Briggs to shoot him; however, Briggs discards his gun and rushes Gauge, allowing Gauge the chance to stab him in the stomach with his knife. Gauge then finishes the injured Briggs off with the bullet remaining in his gun's chamber.

Ryan, Erin and Griff reunite with Sykes outside the mill, who reveals that he has rigged the entire mill with a self-destruct mechanism that he needs to be close to the building to activate. Revealing his infection, Ryan volunteers to drive the dying Sykes back into the mill. They successfully trigger the bombs before Ryan is killed by Shadow Rock's forces, and Braylon, watching his work go up in flames in dismay, is attacked and killed by an infected subject.

Gauge, who escaped the explosion, salutes Griff and Erin for their work. He reveals Braylon's fate to them, then assures them that none of the infected subjects or sugar got out. However, in a final flashback, the last part of Santiago's transmission is revealed, in which he instructs Gauge to exterminate everything at the mill and then get ready to "go hunting."

In an epilogue, people from all walks of life are seen consuming large quantities of Just Rite sugar. Everything appears normal until an elderly man being examined in a hospital appears to have the infection's boils on his body. As the doctor leaves the room, the view zooms out, revealing the entire waiting room filled with victims suffering from the infection.

Cast

Notes

References 

 Citations

External links 
 

2008 films
2008 horror films
2000s English-language films